KidZania Tokyo is a family edutainment center amusement park, in the LaLaport Toyosu, Tokyo, Japan opened in October 2006. A part of the Kidzania franchise, Kidzania Tokyo is the third ever Kidzania theme park ever built, preceded by Mexico City and Monterrey, and succeeded by Kidzania Jakarta. As like other Kidzania Theme parks, the Tokyo franchise offers 70 occupations for enjoyment by children; nevertheless, it was nearly identical to any other Kidzania theme parks in the franchise.

The park, as like other parks (excluding Kidzania Jakarta) in the franchise, aimed at children from the age of three to fourteen. Although it looks smaller than any other parks in the franchise, the occupations offered remained similar to its Mexican counterparts.

Hours of operation 
There have been no changes during the past few years. However, Kidzania Tokyo is occasionally closed for maintenance on weekdays. Kidzania Tokyo is open for two sessions every day, unlike Kidzania Jakarta.
1st session: 0900-1500hrs
2nd session: 1600-2100hrs

Entry 
As alike to any other parks in the franchise, the park provides a 50  check available for replacement with real money, and can be used at any establishment charged with a certain amount of money. You must work if you run out of Kidzos.

Contrary to any other Kidzania theme parks, Kidzania Tokyo allows pets to enter the park. However, it should be at control of visitors. The park issued a Terms And Conditions rule  to maintain a safe and healthy playing environment in the park. Any disruptive, offensive, vulgar, libellous or any other activities disrupting the activity at Kidzania Tokyo, will result in the expulsion of the visitor from the park.

References

External links 
 

Amusement parks in Japan
Kidzania theme parks
Buildings and structures in Koto, Tokyo
Tourist attractions in Tokyo
2006 establishments in Japan